Adrijana is a given name of Slavic origin, meaning Adriana. Notable people with the name include:

Adrijana Delić (born 1996), Serbian footballer
Adrijana Hodžić (born 1975), Kosovar politician
Adrijana Knežević (born 1987), Serbian basketball player 
Adrijana Krasniqi (born 1997), Swedish singer of Albanian-Macedonian origin
Adrijana Lekaj (born 1995), Kosovan-Croatian tennis player
Adrijana Mori (born 2000), Slovenian footballer
Adrijana Pupovac (born 1984), Serbian politician

Slavic given names
Serbian feminine given names